Solitair Brickell is a high-rise apartment building in the Brickell district of Miami, Florida, USA. The building was built in the place of a ramp to a parking garage to an adjacent 1980s office building known as the Brickell Bayview Center during a wave of high-rise residential development in the Greater Downtown Miami area in the 2010s. The building is adjacent to Brickell City Centre, a large mixed-use development completed in 2016.

See also
 List of tallest buildings in Miami

References

External links

Residential skyscrapers in Miami
2018 establishments in Florida
Residential buildings completed in 2018
Residential condominiums in Miami